Eliachna digitana is a species of moth of the family Tortricidae. It is found from Chile (Ñuble Province, Santiago, Maule Region) to Argentina (Chubut Province). The habitat ranges from coastal Nothofagus forests to arid uplands.

The ground colour of the forewings ranges from gold grey to red brown with dark brown reticulations. The hindwings are brownish grey with faint mottling. Adults have been recorded on wing from October to April.

Etymology
The species name refers to the digitate process that comprises the distal portion of the sacculus.

References

Moths described in 2002
Tortricidae of South America
Euliini
Moths of South America